Meng Yan (born 30 September 1980 in Jilin) is a Chinese track and field athlete who specialises in the 400 metre hurdles.

He won the silver medal at the 2006 Asian Games. He competed at the 2008 Olympic Games without reaching the final.

His personal best time is 49.03 seconds, achieved in May 2006 in Bangalore. This is the national record in the 400 m hurdles. He won the national championships in the event for a sixth time in 2009.

References

Team China 2008

1980 births
Living people
Athletes (track and field) at the 2008 Summer Olympics
Chinese male hurdlers
Olympic athletes of China
Runners from Jilin
Asian Games medalists in athletics (track and field)
Athletes (track and field) at the 2006 Asian Games
Athletes (track and field) at the 2010 Asian Games
Asian Games silver medalists for China
Medalists at the 2006 Asian Games